Dream Skipper is the third album by Japanese singer Nana Mizuki, released on 27 November 2003.

Track listing

Lyrics: Naoko
Composition, arrangement: Tsutomu Ohira
Be Ready
Lyrics, composition, arrangement: Toshiro Yabuki
Keep your hands in the air
Lyrics: Toshiro Yabuki
Composition, arrangement: Takahiro Iida
Still In the Groove
Lyrics, composition, arrangement: Toshiro Yabuki

Lyrics: Toshiro Yabuki
Composition, arrangement: Tsutomu Ohira
Dear to me
Lyrics, composition, arrangement: Toshiro Yabuki
What cheer?
Lyrics: Toshiro Yabuki
Composition, arrangement: Takahiro Iida
Jet Park
Lyrics: Nana Mizuki
Composition: Takahiro Iida
Arrangement: Takahiro Iida, Tsutomu Ohira
White Lie
Lyrics: Naoko
Composition, arrangement: Akimitsu Honma
Nocturne: revision
Lyrics, composition: Chiyomaru Shikura
Arrangement: Tsutomu Ohira
New recording for opening song of anime television Memories Off 2nd

Lyrics: Naoko
Composition: Akimitsu Honma
Arrangement: Akimitsu Honma, Tsutomu Ohira

Lyrics: Nana Mizuki
Composition, arrangement: Tsutomu Ohira
In a fix
Lyrics, composition, arrangement: Toshiro Yabuki
New Sensation
Lyrics, composition, arrangement: Toshiro Yabuki
Refrain: Classico
Lyrics, composition: Toshiro Yabuki
Arrangement: Toshiro Yabuki, Tsutomu Ohira

Charts

External links
  

2003 albums
Nana Mizuki albums